Dineh Kuh (also Romanized as Dīneh Kūh,Known as the village of mothers) is a village in Alamut-e Bala Rural District, Rudbar-e Alamut District, Qazvin County, Qazvin Province, Iran. According to the census in 2015, the population of Dinehkoh was recorded with 95 households and about 250 people. In the years 2020-2023, after the renovations carried out by the village residents, the streets of the village were named after the women and mothers of the village, and hence the village became known as the village of mothers.

See Also 

 Qazvin province
 Alamut-e Bala Rural District
 Alamut-e Sharqi District

References 

Populated places in Qazvin County